Aadeel Akhtar is a neuroscientist and electrical engineer. He is CEO and founder of the bionics company PSYONIC. In 2021, he was named one of MIT Technology Review’s 35 Innovators Under 35 and was featured in Newsweek’s “America's 50 Greatest Disruptors: Visionaries Who Are Changing the World.”

Academic career 
Akhtar earned his Ph.D. in Neuroscience and M.S. in Electrical & Computer Engineering from the University of Illinois at Urbana-Champaign in 2016. He received a B.S. in Biology in 2007 and M.S. in Computer Science in 2008 at Loyola University Chicago.

PSYONIC 
Akhtar launched PSYONIC in 2015 while a graduate student at UIUC. The company's first product, the Ability Hand, is the fastest bionic hand in the world with sensors that attach to the users’ remaining limb, allowing them to control the hand with their arm muscles. It is also the first hand on the market to give users touch feedback, so they can feel what sensors in the fingertips are experiencing, and it is covered by Medicare.

He says that he was first inspired to work on affordable and accessible prosthetic limbs when he met an amputee as a child on a family trip to Pakistan.

The company offers a research version of their bionic hand that is used by organizations like Apptronik, NASA, and Meta. Two of the top five finishers in the ANA AVATAR XPRIZE used PSYONIC Ability Hands.

Akhtar and PSYONIC also develop artificial tendons and collaborate with Northwestern University’s John Rogers on flexible patches that provide haptic feedback through the skin for augmented reality applications.

References

External links 
 

American neuroscientists
American technology executives
Inventors from Illinois
Scientists from Illinois
Year of birth missing (living people)
Living people
People from Streamwood, Illinois